Mohammad Nazmul Hossain (born 5 October 1987) is a Bangladeshi cricketer. He was born in Habiganj, Bangladesh.

Nazmul Hossain was part of the 13-man Bangladesh squad that played in the 2010 Asian Games in late November. They played against Afghanistan in the final and won by five wickets, securing the country's first gold medal at the Asian Games.

References

External links
 

1987 births
Living people
Bangladeshi cricketers
Bangladesh Test cricketers
Bangladesh One Day International cricketers
Bangladesh Twenty20 International cricketers
Sylhet Division cricketers
Cricketers at the 2010 Asian Games
Asian Games gold medalists for Bangladesh
Cricketers at the 2011 Cricket World Cup
Asian Games medalists in cricket
Sylhet Strikers cricketers
Dhaka Dominators cricketers
Legends of Rupganj cricketers
Old DOHS Sports Club cricketers
Abahani Limited cricketers
Gazi Tank cricketers
Prime Doleshwar Sporting Club cricketers
Bangladesh North Zone cricketers
Bangladesh East Zone cricketers
Bangladesh South Zone cricketers
Rajshahi Division cricketers
Medalists at the 2010 Asian Games
People from Habiganj District
20th-century Bengalis
21st-century Bengalis